The cycling competition at the 1999 Pan American Games was held in Winnipeg, Manitoba, Canada.

Men's competition

Men's Individual Road Race
 Held on August 4 over 203.3 kilometres

Men's Road Time Trial
 Held on July 25 over 55.2 kilometres

Men's 1000 m Track Time Trial
 Held on July 28

Men's 4000 m Individual Pursuit
 Held on July 29

Men's Match Sprint
 Held on July 30

Men's Points Race
 Held on July 30

Men's 4000 m Team Pursuit
 Held on July 30

Men's Madison
 Held on July 31

Men's Keirin
 Held on July 31

Men's Olympic Sprint
 Held on July 31

Men's Mountain Bike Race
 Held on August 2 (Started 19, Finished 14)

Women's competition

Women's Individual Road Race
 Held on August 4 over 81.3 kilometres

Women's Road Time Trial
 Held on July 25 over 27.5 kilometres

Women's 500 m Time Trial
 Held on July 28

Women's Match Sprint
 Held on July 30

Women's 3000 m Individual Pursuit
 Held on July 30

Women's 25 km Points Race
 Held on July 31

Women's Mountain Bike Race
 Held on August 2

Medal table

Notes

References

Results
UOL results
Cyclingnews

Pan American
1999
Events at the 1999 Pan American Games
1999 in road cycling
1999 in track cycling
1999 in mountain biking
International cycle races hosted by Canada